Brisebois is a surname. Notable people with the surname include:

 Danielle Brisebois (born 1969), American music producer and songwriter 
 Éphrem-A. Brisebois (1850–1890), Canadian politician, soldier, and policeman
 Julien BriseBois (born 1977), Canadian ice hockey executive
 Patrice Brisebois (born 1971), French Canadian professional ice hockey player